Rafsanjan County is in Kerman province, Iran. The capital of the county is the city of Rafsanjan. At the 2006 census, the county's population was 291,417, in 71,830 households. The following census in 2011 counted 287,921 people in 76,797 households, by which time Anar District had been separated from the county to form Anar County. At the 2016 census, the county's population was 311,214 in 91,511 households.

Former Iranian president, Akbar Hashemi Rafsanjani was born in Bahreman, in Rafsanjan County.

Administrative divisions

The population history and structural changes of Rafsanjan County's administrative divisions over three consecutive censuses are shown in the following table. The latest census shows four districts, 14 rural districts, and five cities.

References

 

Counties of Kerman Province